Dave Seaman (born 29 April 1968) is a British DJ and record producer. He was formerly a member of the DMC Publishing, and editor of music magazine Mixmag.

Biography
He formed Brothers in Rhythm with Steve Anderson and they were later joined by Alan Bremner, doing production work for (amongst others) Pet Shop Boys and Kylie Minogue and remixes for David Bowie, New Order, U2, Michael Jackson and more.

He has since founded Audio Therapy record label and now runs Selador Recordings with Steve Parry.  He is also well known for his releases in the famed Renaissance Masters Series and a number of releases for Global Underground.

Early life
He went to school in Garforth, West Yorkshire.

Discography

Mix albums
1991: Mixmag, Vol. 1 with Carl Cox (DMC)
1993: DJ Culture, Vol. 1 with Sasha and John Digweed (Stress Records)
1995: DJ Culture, Vol. 2 with Nick Warren (Stress Records)
1995: Mixmag, Vol. 10 with Masters at Work (DMC)
1995: DJs at Work, Vol. 1 (Pimp Music)
1996: Renaissance Vol. 4 (Six 6)
1996: Renaissance The Silk Mix
1997: Renaissance Worldwide: London with Robert Miles (Renaissance)
1998: Renaissance Worldwide: Singapore with David Morales and BT (Renaissance)
1999: Global Underground: Buenos Aires (Boxed)
1999: Back to Mine (DMC)
1999: Renaissance Worldwide: America (Renaissance)
2000: Renaissance: Awakening (Renaissance)
2000: Global Underground: Cape Town (Boxed)
2001: Renaissance: Desire (Renaissance)
2002: Global Underground: Melbourne (Global Underground)
2004: Therapy Sessions with Phil K (Renaissance)
2005: Therapy Sessions, Vol. 2 with Luke Chable (Renaissance)
2005: This is Audiotherapy (Audio Therapy)
2006: Renaissance: The Masters Series, Part 7 (Renaissance)
2007: Therapy Sessions, Vol.3 with Lexicon Avenue (Audio Therapy)
2007: Therapy Sessions, Vol.4 (Audio Therapy)
2008: Renaissance: The Masters Series, Part 10 (Renaissance)
2009: Renaissance: The Masters Series, Part 14 (Renaissance)
2010: Global Underground: Lithuania (Global Underground)
2011: Renaissance: The Masters Series, Part 17 (Renaissance)
2013: The Selador Sessions (Selador)
2015: Beyond Borders: Berlin (Armada)

Singles
2013: "The Holy Ghost" (Tulipa)
2013: "Everything Come in Threes" (Tulipa)
2014: "Naughty Forest" (Selador)
2014: "Justified Replacement of Lulu" (Selador)
2014: "Distraction Tactics" (Sullivan Room)
2015: "Right Side of Wrong" (Sudbeat)
2015: "Sparkle Motion" (Tulipa)
2015: "Dance in Tongues/Strobelight Symphony" (Noir)
2015: "Private Education" (Suara)
2015: "Gumball" (Hive Audio)
2016: "Nightfalls" (Selador)
2016: "Do Geese See God/Devil Never Even Lived" (Carioca)

References

External links
Official website

1968 births
People from Garforth
English DJs
DJs from Leeds
English record producers
English house musicians
Living people
Progressive house musicians
Electronic dance music DJs
People educated at Garforth Academy
Musicians from West Yorkshire